The Canol Project was constructed during World War II to ensure a supply of oil for the defense of Alaska and the North American west coast. The project was completed in two years at an astronomical cost and was abandoned less than a year later.

History 

During World War II the United States was concerned about Japan attacking the west coast and cutting off supply lines to Alaska. They built the Alaska Highway to connect Alaska to the rest of the United States and conceived the CANOL (Canadian Oil) project to ensure a supply of oil from Norman Wells. The US War Department decided to construct the project in April 1942 and it was assigned to the United States Army Corps of Engineers.

Construction 

W.A. Bechtel Co, H. Price & Co. and W. E. Callahan Construction Co. formed a consortium to construct the project. Known as Bechtel-Price-Callahan it also included six associated companies. Standard Oil Company was a consultant on the project and would operate the refinery in Whitehorse. Imperial Oil owned the Norman Wells field and would be responsible for the supply of oil. J. Gordon Turnbull and Sverdrup and Parcel were chosen to the project's architect and engineer of record.

The eventual scope of the project included:

 An  barge supply route from Waterways, Alberta to Norman Wells
 A series of ten airfields stretching from Edmonton to Norman Wells
 An  winter road from Peace River, Alberta to Norman Wells
 A water and rail-based supply route via Prince Rupert and Skagway, Alaska
 An all-weather road between Norman Wells and Johnson's Crossing, Yukon 
 A refinery in Whitehorse, Yukon 
 Norman Wells (Canol No. 1)
 Skagway (Canol No.2)
 Watson Lake (Canol No.3), and
 Fairbanks (Canol No. 4)
 A telegraph system connecting all key points of the project

The pipeline was just  in diameter.  The low gravity crude oil from Norman Wells had a pour point well below the freezing mark and could be run through a narrow pipeline without being heated. The pipeline was laid on the surface of the ground to simplify construction and maintenance. Ten pump stations were needed to move the crude oil to Whitehorse. The pumps were specially designed to be able to use the Norman Wells crude as fuel. An additional 19 pump stations moved the refined fuel along the Alaska Highway from Whitehorse as far as Watson Lake and Fairbanks.

The final construction cost for the Canol Project construction has been estimated at $134 million and may have been closer to $300 million when military personnel are included.

Operation and decommissioning 

The last pipeline weld was completed on February 16, 1944 near Macmillan Pass. The first crude oil reached the refinery in Whitehorse on April 16 and the grand opening was held on April 30. Initially only able to produce gasoline, it was finally able to produce aviation gas in November 1944.

Due to its remoteness and challenging conditions the costs to provide fuel from the Canol were considerably higher than having fuel arrive via tanker. On March 8, 1945 the US War Department made the decision to shut the project down. Work began immediately to winterize all equipment, clean and stock camps and remove all personnel. Shortly after the line was declared as surplus to the war effort. Imperial Oil purchased equipment at Norman Wells for $3 million. Imperial also paid $1 million for the Whitehorse refinery, which had been installed at a cost of $27 million, which they then dismantled and shipped to Alberta. The salvage rights for the remainder of the line were sold for $700,000 and carried out by George Price of Dawson Creek, British Columbia. Some valuable equipment was salvaged but much of the pipeline, telegraph wire, vehicles and buildings were left in place.

Current status 

The Canol Road is still seasonally maintained within the Yukon and is known as Highway 6. A ferry in the community of Ross River, Yukon is used to cross the Pelly River. There are several old vehicle dumps remaining on the Yukon side and an old pipeline crossing remains in Ross River. The bridge has been used as a footbridge and was recently refurbished.

In the Northwest Territories the road is no longer maintained and is now the Canol Heritage Trail.  It is estimated that 46,000 barrels of crude oil were spilled along the pipeline route. Many of the abandoned buildings and vehicles contain hazardous materials and telegraph wire has entangled animals such as moose and caribou. Clean-up of telegraph wire began in 2015 and most of the wire along the trail has been coiled up for removal. Remediation work began in 2018 to remove contaminants, telegraph wire and other safety hazards along the trail and expected to be completed in 2020. Remediation of the trail will allow the creation of Doi T'oh territorial park to proceed as set out in the Sahtu Dene and Metis Comprehensive Land Claim Agreement.

Cleanup began in 2018 at the former site of the refinery in Whitehorse, known locally as the Marwell tar pit. Work was expected to be completed in 2020 at a cost of almost $7 million dollars.

See also 
 Canol Road
 Canol Heritage Trail

References 

Oil pipelines
Oil pipelines in Canada
Oil pipelines in Alaska
History of the Northwest Territories
History of Yukon
Transport buildings and structures in the Northwest Territories
Transport buildings and structures in Yukon